Tongod District may refer to:

 Tongod District, Malaysia
 Tongod District, Peru